Datuk Haji Sabiamad Abdul Ahad  (20 March 1956 – 10 April 2021) was a Malaysian sport shooter. 

Sabiamad was born in Muar, Johor and was the Standard Pistol and Free Pistol shooting champion and also national record holder. 

He ruled the Air Pistol event at the South-East Asia level and also the Central Pistol, Rapid Pistol and Standard Pistol events. Among his achievements were winning gold medals at the Singapore 1983 SEA Games in the men's 50m pistol and Jakarta 1987 SEA Games in the men's fire pistol shooting events. He had also competed and became the Malaysia's flag bearer in the 1984 Summer Olympics at the Los Angeles, United States. 

After retirement in 1990s, he continued to be active in the sport as a coach and manager of the national shooting squad, including stints as the national team manager in the Myanmar 2013 SEA Games, Singapore 2017 SEA Games and the Rio 2016 Summer Olympics. He had also been a board member of the National Athletes Welfare Foundation (YAKEB).

Death 
Sabiamad, aged 65, died of heart attack in Hospital Serdang, Selangor at 11.00 p.m. on 10 April 2021. He was laid to rest at the Kampung Sungai Ramal Dalam Muslim Cemetery in Kajang. Selangor.

Honours

Honours of Malaysia
  :
  Member of the Order of the Defender of the Realm (AMN) (1985)
  :
  Commander of the Order of the Territorial Crown (PMW) – Datuk (2011)

References

External links
 
 

1956 births
2021 deaths
Johor
Malaysian people of Malay descent
Malaysian Muslims
Malaysian male sport shooters
Olympic shooters of Malaysia
Shooters at the 1984 Summer Olympics
Southeast Asian Games medalists in shooting
Southeast Asian Games gold medalists for Malaysia
Competitors at the 1983 Southeast Asian Games
Competitors at the 1987 Southeast Asian Games
Members of the Order of the Defender of the Realm